Bassel Zakaria Jradi (born 6 July 1993) is a professional footballer who plays as an attacking midfielder for Cypriot club Apollon Limassol and the Lebanon national team.

After playing for three years in Denmark – for B.93, AB, and Nordsjælland – Jradi moved to Norway in 2014, signing for Strømsgodset. In 2018, after four years in Norway, Jradi moved to Croatian side Hajduk Split, then to Apollon Limassol in Cyprus in 2021, helping them lift the 2021–22 league title.

Born in Denmark to Lebanese parents, Jradi played for Denmark internationally at youth level before switching allegiance to Lebanon in 2015. He represented Lebanon at the 2019 AFC Asian Cup.

Early life
Born in Copenhagen, Denmark to Lebanese parents, Jradi began his youth career at Skjold aged five.

Club career

B.93
Jradi moved to B.93 aged seven, and made his senior debut in the Danish 2nd Division on 30 April 2011 in the 2010–11 season, in a 4–2 home defeat to LFA. Jradi became the first player born after B.93's 100-year anniversary (19 May 1993) to debut for their first team. In the following match, he scored a brace and assisted once in a 4–2 win against Avarta.

Jradi started the 2011–12 season by scoring in his first two matches, against Hvidovre (2–1 defeat) and Skjold Birkerød (2–1 win). In the second-to-last game of the season, he was sent off in a 2–1 defeat against Svebølle (it was his second red card of the season); B.93 were relegated outside of the "Danish tournament" for the first time. Jradi played 33 games and scored eight goals for B.93.

AB
Having gone on trial for Danish club OB and English club Blackburn Rovers in 2011, Jradi moved to Danish 1st Division side AB in summer 2012. He scored eight goals and made three assists, making him the club's top scorer of the season.

Nordsjælland
At the end of the 2012–13 season, Jradi signed a three-and-a-half-year contract with Superliga side Nordsjælland. He didn't feature much for the side, only playing four league games and a match in the UEFA Europa League play-offs.

Strømsgodset and loan to Lillestrøm
In July 2014, Jradi was purchased by Strømsgodset, and signed a contract which lasted until the end of 2017.

In January 2016, he signed for Lillestrøm in Tippeligaen on loan until the end of the year, scoring four league goals in 26 games.

Hajduk Split

2018–19 season
On 11 August 2018, Jradi joined Croatian First League club Hajduk Split on a two-year deal. His first goal for the club came on 10 May 2019, in a 2–0 home win over Slaven. He scored once again in the following matchday, played four days later, against Rudeš in a 4–1 away win. Jradi ended the 2018–19 season with two goals in 25 appearances, helping his side finish fourth in the league.

2019–20 season
On 18 July 2019, Jradi scored his first Europa League qualifier goal in the home game against Gżira United of Malta. However, his side lost on the away goals rule and were knocked out of the qualifiers. In the Eternal derby against Dinamo Zagreb in the league, on 31 August 2019, Jradi scored the lone goal in the 56th minute, before being sent off after receiving two yellow cards during the match. Thanks to his performance in the game, Jradi was nominated Man of the Match and helped his side reach the top of the table for the first time in 1,399 days. After the game, the player stated: "This was a crazy game with crazy fans. Incredible. Red cards, goals, everything was crazy".

On 29 June 2020, Hajduk Split extended Jradi's contract, which was due to expire in July, for an additional year. On 25 July 2020, Jradi scored from outside the box and assisted a goal against Inter Zaprešić in a 4–1 away win on the last matchday of the season. Jradi ended the season with three league goals in 32 games.

2020–21 season
On 29 August 2020, in matchday 3 of the league, Jradi provided his first assist of the season against Slaven Belupo, in a 2–2 draw.

In February 2021, Jradi refused to renew his contract with Hajduk Split, wanting to move to another team on a free transfer the following summer transfer window. The management sent him to train with the reserves for the rest of the season as a form of "punishment". According to the Croatian Football Federation, however, he couldn't play official games as "a player older than 21 who has already played at least five games during the season for the first team cannot play for the B team".

On 21 May, Jradi and Hajduk Split agreed to terminate the contract on mutual consent; he scored seven goals in 81 games in all competitions in his three-year stay.

Apollon Limassol
On 22 June 2021, Jradi joined Cypriot First Division side Apollon Limassol. He scored on his club debut on 22 July, in a 3–1 defeat to Žilina in the 2021–22 UEFA Europa Conference League qualification. Jradi also scored in the away game against Žilina one week later, with the match ending 2–2. On 23 August, he scored in the first matchday of the 2021–22 league season, helping Apollon win 4–2 against Ethnikos Achna.

In May 2022, Jradi was shortlisted in the 2021–22 PASP Football Awards as one of 11 nominees in the forward position. With three goals in 22 league games, he helped Apollon win the league title for the first time in 15 seasons.

International career

Denmark
After impressing during his season with AB in 2012–13, Jradi represented Denmark internationally at under-20 and under-21 levels. He played for Denmark at all youth levels (from the under-16s to the under-21s) between 2008 and 2013, playing a combined 23 games and scoring twice.

Lebanon

Eligible to represent Lebanon through his descent, Jradi made his debut for their senior team on 26 August 2015; he scored the temporary 2–1 goal in a friendly against Iraq, which eventually finished in a 3–2 defeat. After the match, regarding his national team choice between Lebanon and Denmark, he stated: "both countries mean a lot to me. It's a big decision".

Although in January 2018 Jradi had stated that he aimed to play for Denmark, in November of the same year he was called up for Lebanon for the friendly matches against Uzbekistan and Australia. In December 2018, he was called up for the 2019 AFC Asian Cup squad. After playing the whole 90 minutes in the first group stage game against Qatar, Jradi fell into a disagreement with coach Miodrag Radulović and was subsequently ruled out of the national team for the rest of the tournament.

On 5 September 2019, the Lebanese Football Association (LFA) announced Jradi's indefinite exclusion from the national team, alongside teammate Joan Oumari, for refusing a call-up for a 2022 FIFA World Cup qualifying match against North Korea. After issuing an apology explaining his reasons for refusing the call-up, the LFA lifted the exclusion and Jradi was reintegrated to the national team on 19 September.

Style of play
Usually deployed as an attacking midfielder, Jradi can also play on both wings, as a central midfielder, or as a false nine.

Career statistics

Club

International

Scores and results list Lebanon's goal tally first, score column indicates score after each Jradi goal.

Honours
Strømsgodset
 Eliteserien runner-up: 2015

Apollon Limassol
 Cypriot First Division: 2021–22
 Cypriot Super Cup: 2022

See also
 List of Lebanon international footballers born outside Lebanon

References

External links

 Profile at FC Nordsjælland 
 Profile at HNK Hajduk Split 
 Profile at Apollon Limassol FC 
 

1993 births
Living people
Footballers from Copenhagen
Danish people of Lebanese descent
Sportspeople of Lebanese descent
Lebanese footballers
Danish men's footballers
Association football midfielders
Association football wingers
BK Skjold players
Boldklubben af 1893 players
Akademisk Boldklub players
FC Nordsjælland players
Strømsgodset Toppfotball players
Lillestrøm SK players
HNK Hajduk Split players
Apollon Limassol FC players
Danish 2nd Division players
Danish 1st Division players
Danish Superliga players
Eliteserien players
Norwegian Second Division players
Croatian Football League players
Cypriot First Division players
Denmark youth international footballers
Denmark under-21 international footballers
Lebanon international footballers
2019 AFC Asian Cup players
Lebanese expatriate footballers
Lebanese expatriate sportspeople in Norway
Lebanese expatriate sportspeople in Croatia
Lebanese expatriate sportspeople in Cyprus
Danish expatriate men's footballers
Danish expatriate sportspeople in Norway
Danish expatriate sportspeople in Croatia
Danish expatriate sportspeople in Cyprus
Expatriate footballers in Norway
Expatriate footballers in Croatia
Expatriate footballers in Cyprus